The American carrion beetle (Necrophila americana, formerly Silpha americana) is a North American beetle of the family Silphidae. It lays its eggs in, and its larvae consume, raw flesh (particularly that of dead animals) and fungi. The larvae and adults also consume fly larvae and the larvae of other carrion beetles that compete for the same food sources as its larvae.

Range
The beetle lives in North America east of the Rocky Mountains, with its southern boundary from eastern Texas to Florida and the northern boundary from Minnesota to southeastern Canada including New Brunswick and Maine.

Appearance
Adults are 12 to 22 mm long. The pronotum is primarily a pale yellow with a black spot in the center. In the southern portion of the range, the elytra are entirely black while in the northern portion they have a yellow rear tip. The elytra are shorter than the body of the beetle, leaving the tail end slightly exposed. The larvae are black and appear armored.

Lifecycle 

From spring through fall, during daylight, a few hours after flies begin arriving at a carcass, the adult beetles will arrive as well. They immediately begin eating the already hatching fly larvae, mating, and laying their own eggs. As long as the carcass lasts, the adults will remain eating competitors to give their own larvae a chance to eat and grow.  Upon hatching from the eggs, the larvae will eat both the carcass and other larvae that are within it. Eventually the larvae will fall to the ground, dig into the dirt, and pupate.  Overwintering is done by adults.

Mutualism 
The beetle is known to engage in mutualistic phoresis with mites of the genus Poecilochirus. Upon arrival at a carcass, these mites drop from the beetle and begin eating the eggs and larvae of the flies that preceded the beetles (and continue to lay more eggs even as the beetles are active). They will eventually return to the adults and be transported to the next carcass. Some of their young will hitch a ride with the beetles' young upon their emergence from the pupal stage.

References

External links
American Carrion Beetle, American Insects

Silphidae
Beetles of North America
Beetles described in 1758
Taxa named by Carl Linnaeus